"Saturno" is a song recorded by Spanish singer-songwriter Pablo Alborán for his fourth studio album Prometo (2017). The song was released worldwide on 8 September 2017,  by Warner Music Spain as the album's first single. The song is the main theme of the Mexican telenovela Caer en tentación.

Charts

Certifications

Awards and nominations

References

2017 singles
Pablo Alborán songs
Songs written by Pablo Alborán
2017 songs
Warner Music Spain singles
Song recordings produced by Julio Reyes Copello